Kassuende Bridge is a bridge in Mozambique across the Zambezi River. People traveling between Malawi and Zimbabwe do not need to pass through Tete and this helps in reducing the traffic on the current bridge.

Gallery

See also 
 
 
 
 List of crossings of the Zambezi River

References

Bridges in Mozambique
Bridges over the Zambezi River
Buildings and structures in Tete Province